Taramangalam is a state assembly constituency in Salem district in Tamil Nadu. It is one of the 234 State Legislative Assembly Constituencies in Tamil Nadu, in India. Elections and winners in the constituency are listed below. The constituency is in existence since 1957 election.

Madras State

Tamil Nadu

Election results

2006

2001

1996

1991

1989

1984

1980

1977

1971

1967

1962

1957

References

External links
 

Former assembly constituencies of Tamil Nadu
Salem district